Edella is a genus of spider mites in the family Tetranychidae. There is at least one described species in Edella, E. clava.

References

Further reading

 

Ameroseiidae
Articles created by Qbugbot